Smithsonian Channel was a British free-to-air television channel that was launched as the UK version of the US documentary network Smithsonian Channel. It launched on 12 February 2019. It closed down on 6 January 2023.  

The content of the channel, much of which is drawn from the US station, comprised predominantly original non-fiction programming covering a range of historical, scientific and cultural subjects.

Carriage

Test transmissions for the new services began with the addition of HD and subsequently SD broadcast capacity on the Astra 2G satellite in late 2018. Broadcast of video tests began in HD in December 2018, with SD following shortly thereafter.

The channel was officially made available on 12 February 2019. Ahead of the launch, it had been suggested that the network would begin on satellite, then launch on Freeview in the spring: however, in practice the channel went live on all four of the UK's main TV platforms on the same date.

The free-to-air channel was also made available on Freesat. The Freesat broadcast uses an HD swap-out system similar to that used by Channel 5, S4C and TRT World.

Smithsonian Channel has also been made available on the Virgin Media cable platform. As Virgin no longer supplies SD receivers to its customers, only the HD version of the channel is available on cable.

Prior to the channel's launch it had been indicated that Smithsonian Channel would be made available to Freeview devices "in the spring" In practice, though, capacity on the Arqiva-operated COM7 multiplex was secured to enable the channel to go live at the same time as on other platforms. Smithsonian eventually moved to provide increased coverage. Only the standard-definition version of Smithsonian broadcasts on a DVB-T multiplex alongside other SD channels, so most homes could receive the channel with their DVB-T receivers on channel number 57.

Advance weekly listings for the Smithsonian Channel were carried in Radio Times magazine from February 2019.

On January 7, 2020, following the closure of 5Spike, Smithsonian Channel moved to channel 57 on Freeview. On March 9, 2020, the channel moved to channel 160 on Sky following closure of VH1 to prevent the slot from no longer being able to be reused, later to move to channel 173 there on 14 April 2020 to allow Sky plc to move Challenge to 160 to accommodate the launches of Sky Documentaries and Sky Nature and rebrand of History to Sky History.

Closure 
On December 15, 2022, it was announced that the channel would be closing on January 6, 2023 after nearly four years on air. Its programming will be shifted to online platforms, including Paramount+, My5 and Pluto TV.

Its last program was the 2010 documentary film "Earth Under Water", airing from 5:00 AM to 6:00 AM (London Time), when the channel finally closed. As of January 10, 2023, the website is still up.

See also 
Smithsonian Channel - original US version of the station
Smithsonian Channel (Canada) - Canadian version of the station
PBS America - similar UK channel showing predominantly US documentaries

References

External links

Television channels and stations established in 2019
Television networks in the United Kingdom
Defunct television channels in the United Kingdom
Smithsonian Channel
2023 disestablishments in the United Kingdom
Television channels and stations disestablished in 2023